Raminfar is a Persian surname. Notable people with the surname include:

Iraj Raminfar (born 1949), Persian art director, production designer, and costume designer
Rima Raminfar (born 1970), Iranian actor and screenwriter

Persian-language surnames